Pseudhammus feae is a species of beetle in the family Cerambycidae. It was described by Per Olof Christopher Aurivillius in 1910. It is known from Saint Thomas in the US Virgin Islands.

References

feae
Beetles described in 1910